Mahmut Bakalli (19 January 1936 – 14 April 2006) was a Kosovar Albanian politician.

Bakalli began his political career in the youth organization of the League of Communists of Kosovo, eventually becoming its leader in 1961. In 1967, he became head of the party's Prishtina chapter.  As he rose through the ranks, he was elected to the Central Committee of the party's Serbian chapter, and to the Presidium of the League of Communists of Yugoslavia's Central Committee.

Bakalli led the Communist Party in Kosovo during the late 1970s and early 1980s, but resigned after disagreeing with the way the 1981 protests by ethnic Albanian students were handled by Kosovo's own police, headed by Rahman Morina. Bakalli then spent two years under house arrest, before being expelled from the party. He was after that allowed to work in the province's Science Association until retirement, but was forced out when Slobodan Milošević increased Serbian control over Kosovo in the late 1980s.

He was a member of the Assembly of Kosovo from 2001. He also worked as an adviser to prime minister Agim Çeku. He graduated from the University of Belgrade's Faculty of Political Science.

In 2002, Bakalli was the first witness to testify at The Hague International Criminal Tribunal for the Former Yugoslavia at the trial of Slobodan Milošević.

He died of throat cancer at the age of 70. He had a wife and three daughters.

Notes

References

External links
BBC report on Bakalli's testimony against Slobodan Milošević
Obituary in The Independent

1936 births
2006 deaths
Politicians from Gjakova
Deaths from esophageal cancer
Deaths from cancer in Kosovo
University of Belgrade Faculty of Political Science alumni
League of Communists of Kosovo politicians
Central Committee of the League of Communists of Yugoslavia members
Yugoslav Albanians